Hon. Mohamed, Mohamed Ali, popularly known as Moha Jicho Pevu, is a Kenyan politician, media personality and anchor.

He is a current member of parliament for Nyali Constituency in Mombasa County under UDA ticket. He first contested for the seat in 2017 as an Independent candidate. He is a former chief investigative editor at Kenya Television Network (KTN). He had an expansive media career having worked in various stations as a reporter.

Early years 
Ali was born on August 4, 1979 in Isiolo County.

Education 
In 2000–2002 he attended  News Link College of Journalism for his diploma in journalism. He furthered his education at Moi University where he acquired a bachelor of science (BSc), communication and public relations.

Career
His media journey started in 2002 at Kenya Broadcasting Corporation (KBC) as a TV producer. In 2003 he moved to Pwani FM as a producer/radio presenter. From 2007 to 2017 he was the chief investigations editor of (KTN).

From 2017 to date he is a member of parliament, Nyali Constituency and a member of Special Funds Accounts Committee in the parliament.

References 

1979 births
Living people
Members of the National Assembly (Kenya)
People from Isiolo County
Moi University alumni